Deir Atiyah or Dayr Atiyah is a town in Syria, located between the Qalamoun Mountains and the Eastern Lebanon Mountains Series,  north of the capital Damascus and on the road to the city of Homs. According to the Syria Central Bureau of Statistics (CBS), Deir Atiyah had a population of 10,984  in the 2004 census.

The proximity to a desert region, where the average rainfall does not exceed more than  annually, means that environmental conditions, including poor soil, does not provide adequate resources to economically sustain the local population. Many locals immigrated to the Americas in the early 20th century, to the Persian Gulf countries after the emergence of job opportunities there, and to East Asia.

Agriculture 
Farmers cultivate grapes, apricots, cherries, figs and other fruits.

Deir Atiyah benefits from groundwater located in its valley.

Deir Atiyah has a number of windmills (sometimes referred to as Air Wheels). The power generated by the windmills is used to pump water from deep wells. The origins of the windmills are not known, but they are reported to be a major source of power to pump water for agriculture for more than a hundred years.

Culture 
Deir Atiyah has a museum, a sports center and cultural center. In 2003, the first private university in Syria, University of Kalamoon, was opened in Deir Atiyah.

People in Deir Atiyah consume a hot drink called Mate, which Syrian expatriates brought and introduced from South America. The invitation "Come and drink Mate" is typical of this region's hospitality. The invitation implies not only the sharing of a drink, but also a meal.

History 
Historians match the name of this city with a supposed Roman or Byzantine official, Theodorus Paulus, whose first name means "Gift of God". This name has been associated in minds of successive generations in Dair Atiah for more than thousand years.

A number of ancient Roman channels can be found in Yabroud, close to Deir Atiyah.

In 1838,  its inhabitants were predominantly Sunni Muslims and Greek Orthodox Christians.

Main sights 
 The Museum of Deir Atiyah: The Museum of Deir Atiyah is one of the biggest and richest museums in Damascus suburb,  Reif Dimashq. It contains the heritage and folklore of the region.
 The Canonical Museum of Deir Atiyah
 The Cultural Palace of Deir Atiyah
 The Village of Special Needs
 Hammam el-Souk el-Tahtanye

Civil War 
Deir Atiyah was affected by the Syrian civil war, like any Syrian town and city in Damascus suburbs. It underwent multiple attacks from both the Syrian Armed Forces, and opposition groups. The major impact was in 2013 and 2014.

References

Bibliography

External links  
 Dara3ta.com 
 DairAtiah.net 
 DairAtiah.com 

Cities in Syria
Populated places in An-Nabek District
Christian communities in Syria